Jajrud Rural District is in Jajrud District of Pardis County, Tehran province, Iran. At the National Censuses of 2006 and 2011, its constituent parts were in the Central District of Tehran County. The cities of Bumahen and Pardis, and most of Siyahrud Rural District separated from Tehran County on 29 December 2012 to establish Pardis County. Bumehen and Jajrud Districts were formed at that time.

At the most recent census of 2016, the population of the rural district was 2,264 in 724 households. The largest of its seven villages was Khosrowabad, with 1,083 people.

References 

Pardis County

Rural Districts of Tehran Province

Populated places in Tehran Province

Populated places in Pardis County